Phipps John Hornby (10 January 1853 – 4 April 1936)
was Archdeacon of Lancaster from 1909 to his death.

He was educated at Rugby and Balliol College, Oxford and  ordained in  1877. After a curacy in Lytham St Annes he was Vicar of St Michael's on Wyre from 1885 to 1919.; before his Archdeacon’s appointment.

References

1853 births
People educated at Rugby School
Alumni of Balliol College, Oxford
Archdeacons of Lancaster
1936 deaths